Mitja Kolia Zastrow (born 7 March 1977) is a Dutch swimmer and an Olympic medalist. Originally from Germany, Zastrow was born and raised in Wuppertal, near Düsseldorf. He became a naturalized Dutch citizen in July 2003, after a conflict with the German Swimming Association. He currently trains at PSV Eindhoven in Eindhoven, Netherlands, with his coach, Torsten Petsch.

Zastrow's swimming career has been filled with a series of unfortunate injuries. In 2001, despite being the 100 meter freestyle champion in Germany, a hand injury kept him from attending the FINA World Championships in Fukuoka, Japan.

In 2003, at the FINA World Championships in Barcelona, Spain, Zastrow participated in his first World Championship as a Dutch citizen. However, due to a back injury, he was unable to swim in most of the events that he had qualified for.

Zastrow qualified fifth out of one hundred Dutch swimmers to participate in the 2004 Summer Olympics in Athens, Greece. Along with Pieter van den Hoogenband, Johan Kenkhuis, and Klaas-Erik Zwering, he was a member of the Dutch 4×100 meter freestyle relay team, which won silver by clocking in at 3:14.36.

Zastrow's specialty is actually the backstroke. He has been the Dutch record holder in the 50 meter backstroke since 2003.

Zastrow has a Chinese ideograph tattooed on his left shoulder. The character is "猴" and means "monkey."

See also 
 Dutch records in swimming
 German records in swimming

External links
 Zwemkroniek online profile

References

1977 births
Living people
Dutch male backstroke swimmers
Dutch male freestyle swimmers
Male backstroke swimmers
Olympic swimmers of the Netherlands
Swimmers at the 2004 Summer Olympics
Swimmers at the 2008 Summer Olympics
Olympic silver medalists for the Netherlands
Dutch people of German descent
Sportspeople from Wuppertal
Medalists at the FINA World Swimming Championships (25 m)
European Aquatics Championships medalists in swimming
Medalists at the 2004 Summer Olympics
Olympic silver medalists in swimming
21st-century Dutch people